Rich Hill is an unincorporated community in Knox County, in the U.S. state of Ohio.

History
Rich Hill was originally called Hilliar, and under the latter name was laid out in 1852 when the railroad was extended to that point. The community took its name from nearby Rich Hill. A post office called Rich Hill was established in 1870, and remained in operation until 1927.

References

Unincorporated communities in Knox County, Ohio
1852 establishments in Ohio
Populated places established in 1852
Unincorporated communities in Ohio